Bhadrabahu was a Digambara monk from ancient India. He is called Bhadrabahu II or Bhadrabahu the Junior to distinguish him from the earlier Bhadrabahu.

Biography 
According to Digambara tradition, Bhadrabahu died in 12 BCE.

Association with Varahamihira 

Unlike the Digambara tradition which suggests the existence of multiple distinct men named Bhadrabahu, the Shvetambara tradition mentions only one Bhadrabahu. Two 14th century texts by Shvetambara authors - Merutunga's Prabandha Chintamani and Rajashekhara-suri's Prabandha Kosha (Chaturvimsati prabandha) - describe the 6th-century astrologer Varahamihira as a brother and rival of Bhadrabahu. Merutunga places the two brothers in Pataliputra, while Rajashekhara places them in Pratishthana. The story also appears in some later works with some minor changes; these texts include Rasimanadala-prakarana-vritti and Kalpa-sutra-subhodika-vritti. All these legends are historically inaccurate. The texts by Merutunga and Rajashekhara feature several other anachronisms, such as describing the 7th-century poets Bana and Magha as contemporaries of the 11th-century king Bhoja.

Although these Shvetambara legends identify Varahamihira's alleged brother with the 4th-century BCE Bhadrabahu, it is likely that their authors confused him with either Bhadrabahu II or Bhadrabahu III of the Digambara texts.

According to one theory, Bhadrabahu II of the Digambara tradition is same as the alleged brother of Varahamihira mentioned in the Shvetambara tradition, because both traditions describe him as a pupil of Yashobhadra and knowledgeable about astrology. However, it is equally likely that Bhadrabahu III of the Digambara tradition is same as the alleged brother of Varahamihira mentioned in the Shvetambara tradition, since Varahamihira lived in the 6th-century BCE, not first century BCE.

References 

Indian Jain monks
1st-century BC Indian Jains
1st-century BC Jain monks
1st-century BC Indian monks